Sabitri Bogati (Pathak) is a Nepalese politician, elected to the Pratinidhi Sabha in the 1999 election on behalf of the Nepali Congress.

References

Year of birth missing (living people)
Living people
Nepali Congress politicians from Bagmati Province
Nepal MPs 1999–2002
Khas people